Mount Aylesworth, also named Boundary Peak 176 (first called "Peak 8900"), is a mountain in Alaska and British Columbia, located on the Canada–United States border, and part of the Southern Icefield Ranges of the Saint Elias Mountains.  It is named after Sir Allen Bristol Aylesworth (1854–1952), Canadian constitutional lawyer and member of Alaskan Boundary Tribunal, and who was involved in settling the Alaska boundary dispute between the United States and Canada.

See also
List of Boundary Peaks of the Alaska–British Columbia/Yukon border

References

Mountains of Alaska
Two-thousanders of British Columbia
Saint Elias Mountains
Canada–United States border
International mountains of North America
Mountains of Yakutat City and Borough, Alaska